Bartlett "Bart" S. Adams (April 9, 1866 – August 9, 1944) was an American golfer. He competed in the 1904 Summer Olympics.

He was a member of the Algonquin Golf Club in St. Louis.

References

1866 births
1944 deaths
Golfers at the 1904 Summer Olympics
American male golfers
Olympic golfers of the United States
Golfers from St. Louis